Ziva is an Israeli dish made of puff pastry topped with  sesame seeds, and stuffed with cheese and olives. Ziva is served at home and in restaurants. Ziva is cooked in a style similar to the Yemenite Malawach but its ingredients more closely resemble börek, both of which are also common in Israel. Ziva is usually served alongside a hot sauce (skhug), eggs and Israeli salad.

See also
 Malawach
 Bourekas
 Israeli cuisine
 List of pastries

Israeli pastries
Cheese dishes